Lecomtedoxa nogo is a species of plant in the family Sapotaceae. It is endemic to Gabon.

The species is listed as vulnerable.

References

Flora of Gabon
nogo
Vulnerable plants
Endemic flora of Gabon
Plants described in 1946
Taxonomy articles created by Polbot
Taxa named by André Aubréville
Taxa named by Auguste Chevalier